The 1999 Valencian Community motorcycle Grand Prix was the twelfth round of the 1999 Grand Prix motorcycle racing season. It took place on 19 September 1999 at the Circuit de Valencia.
This race saw the last French Rider to win a race in the premier class until Fabio Quartararo at the 2020 Spanish Grand Prix almost 21 years later.

500 cc classification

250 cc classification

125 cc classification

Championship standings after the race (500cc)

Below are the standings for the top five riders and constructors after round twelve has concluded. 

Riders' Championship standings

Constructors' Championship standings

 Note: Only the top five positions are included for both sets of standings.

References

Valencian Community motorcycle Grand Prix
Valencian
Valencian Motorcycle Grand Prix
20th century in Valencia